The third seeds Charles Donohoe and Ray Dunlop defeated the defending champions Jack Crawford and Harry Hopman 8–6, 6–2, 5–7, 7–9, 6–4 in the final, to win the men's doubles tennis title at the 1931 Australian Championships.

Because of falling light this match had to be ceased on a scheduled day (Saturday, 7 March) with the score at two sets to one for Donohoe/Dunlop and 7–7 in the fourth. The play was resumed on Monday, 9 March.

Seeds

  Jack Crawford /  Harry Hopman (final)
  Dave Thompson /  Jim Willard (semifinals)
  Charles Donohoe /  Ray Dunlop (champions)
  Rupert Shepherd /  Don Turnbull (semifinals)

Draw

Draw

Notes

References

External links
  Source for seedings

1931 in Australian tennis
Men's Doubles